Artur Sergeyevich Karpukhin (born 15 July 1995) is a Russian football player.

He made his debut in the Russian Football National League for FC Baikal Irkutsk on 12 March 2016 in a game against FC Yenisey Krasnoyarsk.

References

External links
 Profile by Russian Football National League

1995 births
People from Angarsk
Living people
Russian footballers
Association football midfielders
FC Baikal Irkutsk players
FC Chita players
Sportspeople from Irkutsk Oblast